Mae Johnson (September 13, 1917 - March 29, 1999) was a singer and dancer who performed in several American films.

She had a leading role in the 1939 film Keep Punching and appears on a lobby card promoting the film. She was also in the 1943 film Stormy Weather performing the song "I Lost My Sugar in Salt Lake City".

She was billed as a sepia Mae West for a show at the Apollo Theater and was also referred to as Harlem's Mae West. She married "Buck" West in June 1942.

Filmography
Keep Punching (1939)
 Stormy Weather (1943)
Thank Your Lucky Stars (1943)
Hers to Hold (1943)

References

1917 births
1999 deaths
20th-century American actresses
20th-century African-American women
20th-century African-American people
20th-century American dancers